"Honky Tonk Song" is a song by country singer George Jones.  It was the lead single from his 1996 LP I Lived to Tell It All.  It was written by Billy Yates and Frank J. Meyers.

Background
The song lampoons what is perhaps the infamous and celebrated drinking story involving Jones, which he recounted in his autobiography, also titled I Lived to Tell It All.  He recalled his second wife Shirley making it physically impossible for him to travel to Beaumont, located 8 miles away, to buy liquor. Because Jones would not walk that far, she would hide the keys to each of their cars they owned before leaving. She did not, however, hide the keys to the lawn mower. Upset, Jones walked to the window and looked out over his property. He later described his thoughts in his memoir: "There, gleaming in the glow, was that ten-horsepower rotary engine under a seat. A key glistening in the ignition. I imagine the top speed for that old mower was five miles per hour. It might have taken an hour and a half or more for me to get to the liquor store, but get there I did."

Jones first poked fun at himself by making a cameo in the video for "All My Rowdy Friends Are Coming Over Tonight" by Hank Williams, Jr. He also parodied the episode in the 1993 video for "One More Last Chance" by Vince Gill.  The country legend finally made his own comical video about the incident for "Honky Tonk Song," which was composed by Billy Yates and Frank J. Meyers specifically about the lawnmower story and Jones' other run-ins with police on the highway.  The song also mentions "ol' Hank," a reference to George's hero Hank Williams.  The single was not a hit, however, peaking at #66 on the Billboard country singles chart.  Jones performed the song during a rare appearance on The Late Show with David Letterman to promote the album.

Chart performance

References

1996 songs
Songs written by Billy Yates (singer)
Songs written by Frank J. Myers
Song recordings produced by Norro Wilson
MCA Records singles
George Jones songs